Der heimliche Aufmarsch (English: "The secret march") is a poem by Erich Weinert written in 1929. In 1930, Wladimir Vogel composed music to it, and there is one extant recording of this original melody with Weinert himself providing the vocals. In 1931, Ernst Busch sang a version of the song at the end of the film Hell on Earth by Victor Trivas. The most famous version is the 1938 remake with a new arrangement by Hanns Eisler, which can be heard at Communist Party rallies from that point forward.

In 1957, the song was rewritten to suit the Cold War under the name Der offene Aufmarsch (English: "The Open Deployment"), sung by the National People's Army in the German Democratic Republic.
 
The Norwegian Worker's Song Hemmeleg oppmarsj (English: "Secret March") and the Swedish socialist song Arbetarbröder (English: "Worker Brothers") use the same melody.

See also
 Hanns Eisler
 Erich Weinert
 Wladimir Vogel
 Ernst Busch
 Hell on Earth (film)

References

Political songs
German-language songs
1930 songs
East German music
Communist songs